Central Dauphin may refer to:
Central Dauphin High School, Harrisburg, Dauphin County, Pennsylvania
Central Dauphin School District, a public school district in central and eastern Dauphin County, Pennsylvania